Isidoro Sariñara y Medina Cuenca (born 1631 in Mexico City) was a Mexican clergyman and bishop for the Roman Catholic Archdiocese of Antequera, Oaxaca. He was ordained in 1683. He was appointed bishop in 1684. He died in 1696.

References 

1631 births
1696 deaths
Mexican Roman Catholic bishops
People from Mexico City